Asociación Deportiva Tarma, commonly referred as ADT, is a Peruvian association football club, playing in the city of Tarma, Junín. The club was founded in 1929, and currently play in Liga 1, which is the first division of the Peruvian league.

History
ADT were 1979 Copa Perú champions, after defeating Comercial Aguas Verdes, Defensor Lima, Deportivo Garcilaso, and Universidad Técnica de Cajamarca.

The club managed to reach the National Stage of the 2010 Copa Perú, after defeating historic teams like Alianza Universidad and Unión Minas in their group; later they were eliminated by Alianza Unicachi of Puno in the semifinals.

In 2011, they reached the National Stage again, but were eliminated by Alianza Universidad in the quarterfinals.

After many years of irregular campaigns, in 2021, the club won Copa Perú for the second time in their history after defeating Alfonso Ugarte from Puno, achieving promotion back to Primera Division after 31 years. ADT ended the 2022 season in thirteenth place.

ADT have played at the highest level of Peruvian football on fourteen occasions, from 1980 Torneo Descentralizado until 1991 Torneo Descentralizado consecutively and then again in 2022 and 2023.

Rivalries
Asociación Deportiva Tarma has had a long-standing rivalry with Sport Dos de Mayo.

Honours

National
Copa Perú: 
Winners (2): 1979, 2021

Regional
Región V:
Winners (1): 2010
Runner-up (1): 2011

Liga Departamental de Junín:
Winners (5): 1970, 1975, 1979, 2017, 2019
Runner-up (7): 1971, 1972, 1973, 1976, 2006, 2009, 2010

Liga Provincial de Tarma:
Winners (5): 1969, 2014, 2015, 2017, 2019
Runner-up (4): 2009, 2010, 2016, 2018

Liga Distrital de Tarma:
Winners (8): 2009, 2013, 2014, 2015, 2016, 2017, 2018, 2019
Runner-up (1): 2010

See also
List of football clubs in Peru
Peruvian football league system

References

Football clubs in Peru
Association football clubs established in 1929